Skyla (born Lucy Batty, 5 March 1991) is an English dance singer from Altrincham.

Career
Skyla was signed by 3 Beat/AATW in 2008. She was working alongside producers Scott Rosser (from Cahill), Mike Di Scala (Ultrabeat) and Nemesis.

Her appearance on the music scene was a song by the Beatplayers on a titled track "Summer Love" and she featured on the track as well as in the music video. The song peaked at 31 on the UK Dance Chart. On 9 June 2009, she released her debut single, "Breaking Free" (a cover of the High School Musical song). On 14 October 2009, she released her second single, a cover of 50 Cent's "Ayo Technology". It received heavy airplay on many channels such as Clubland TV, MTV Dance and Chart Show TV, and was very popular in clubs and bars all across Europe; it peaked at 34 on the UK Dance Chart.

On 3 September 2010, Skyla premiered a new song on YouTube called "Lady Killer" featuring grime artist Bashy. It peaked on the UK Independent Chart.

In 2011, Skyla signed with independent record label Nine Planet Records. Her music video "Disco Drum" was released on YouTube in January 2012. Near the end of October 2012, Skyla and Nine Planet Records released five new songs such as "Loverboy" featuring The Sax Man, "Stereo Boom", "Sexy Trumpet", "Crazy Little Thing" and "Crazy Little Thing (Front Runners Remix)". All of these songs can be found on Nine Planet Records' website.

In total, all of Skyla's music videos have accumulated over five million views on YouTube.

Discography

Singles

References

1991 births
Living people
People from Altrincham
21st-century English women singers
21st-century English singers